Bittacomorpha is a genus of phantom crane flies in the family Ptychopteridae. There are about 11 described species in Bittacomorpha.

Species
These 11 species belong to the genus Bittacomorpha:
 Bittacomorpha affinis
 Bittacomorpha cinctellus
 Bittacomorpha clavipes (Fabricius, 1781) (phantom crane fly)
 Bittacomorpha leachi
 Bittacomorpha occidentalis Aldrich, 1895
 Bittacomorpha ornatellus
 Bittacomorpha pictodes
 Bittacomorpha plicipennis
 Bittacomorpha quadripustulatus
 Bittacomorpha subplicatus
 Bittacomorpha subtilis

References

Further reading

 

Ptychopteridae
Articles created by Qbugbot
Nematocera genera